The McMaster Marauders are the athletic teams that represent McMaster University in Hamilton, Ontario, Canada. Athletics at McMaster is currently managed by the university's student affairs, under their athletics & recreation department. The university's 39 varsity teams compete in the Ontario University Athletics conference of U SPORTS. The Marauder's official colours are maroon and grey.

History
Soccer was the university's first major sport. In 1889, a group of alumni from the Toronto Baptist College and Woodstock College played an exhibition game against one another, sparking an early intercity rivalry (when McMaster University was based in Toronto). A full-fledged hockey club was later organized during the winter of 1896–1897. In 1897, the university had made all athletics, physical activity and sports under the jurisdiction of a central executive committee.

In 1906, McMaster University, along with the University of Ottawa, Royal Military College and University of Trinity College had joined the Canadian Intercollegiate Athletic Union (CIAU), the first formal organization of intercollegiate athletics in Canada and the forerunner of the present day Canadian Interuniversity Sport. The varsity teams have been known as the McMaster Marauders since 1948. The name, the Marauders had been credited to Bill Cline, who on 26 November 1948, had his suggestion for the nickname of the university's men's basketball team published on the school's student newspaper, The Silhouette.

Facilities
The Marauders currently use the sports facilities located in the northeast corner of the main campus of McMaster. The university has a number of sports facilities including the Ron Joyce Stadium for football, the Ivor Wynne Centre for indoor sports, and Back Tens Field for soccer and rugby. Ron Joyce Stadium fields a full sized Canadian football field and FIFA sized soccer pitch. The stadium is also equipped with permanent seating for 5,500. The David Braley Athletic Centre, another sports venue at McMaster, is also used by the Marauders.

The Marauders football team on occasion used Ivor Wynne Stadium, the now-demolished home of the Hamilton Tiger-Cats.

Football

The McMaster football team has been competing in organized play since 1901 and currently plays in the Ontario University Athletics conference in Canadian Interuniversity Sport. The program has won eight Yates Cup conference championships and one Vanier Cup national championship, in 2011. As of the end of the 2011 CFL season, 51 McMaster Marauder alumni have played professionally in the Canadian Football League, including eight that currently play in the CFL.

Championships
The Marauders have won several championships since they began competitive play in their provincial conference, as well as within the national league they are in. The following is a table of the number of championships won by the Marauders men's teams and individual competitors since the Canadian Interuniversity Athletic Union was formed in 1961 as well as the number of championships won by Marauders women's teams and individual competitors since the Ontario Women's Interuniversity Athletic Association was formed in 1971.

The men's water polo team has won the Ontario University Athletics championship 25 times, making it the most successful team at the provincial level. The men's wrestling team has been the most successful team at the national level, winning the CIS championship four times.

Provincial championships

National Championships (U SPORTS, CIS)

References

External links
 

 
U Sports teams
Marauders
Sport in Hamilton, Ontario